Chapoda is a genus of jumping spiders that was first described by George Peckham & Elizabeth Peckham in 1896.

Species
 it contains thirteen species, found in Central America, Colombia, Brazil, Ecuador, and Mexico:
Chapoda angusta Zhang & Maddison, 2012 – Ecuador
Chapoda festiva Peckham & Peckham, 1896 (type) – Guatemala, Panama, Brazil
Chapoda fortuna Zhang & Maddison, 2012 – Panama
Chapoda gaitana Galvis, 2016 – Colombia
Chapoda gitae Zhang & Maddison, 2012 – Colombia, Ecuador
Chapoda inermis (F. O. Pickard-Cambridge, 1901) – Mexico to Panama
Chapoda maxillosa (F. O. Pickard-Cambridge, 1901) – Guatemala, El Salvador, Nicaragua
Chapoda montana (Chickering, 1946) – Panama
Chapoda panamana Chickering, 1946 – Panama, Colombia
Chapoda peckhami Banks, 1929 – Panama
Chapoda recondita (Peckham & Peckham, 1896) – Guatemala, Panama
Chapoda sanlorenzo Galvis, 2016 – Colombia
Chapoda suaita Galvis, 2016 – Colombia

References

Salticidae
Salticidae genera
Spiders of Central America
Spiders of South America